Sarcaulus vestitus is a species of plant in the family Sapotaceae. It is endemic to Brazil.  It is threatened by habitat loss.

References

Flora of Brazil
vestitus
Vulnerable plants
Taxonomy articles created by Polbot
Taxa named by Charles Baehni